KKIA is an FM radio station in Storm Lake, Iowa, operating at 92.9 MHz with a power of 25,000 watts. The station's city of license is Ida Grove, Iowa, where it originally was KIDA. In 1999, the station was purchased by John Eisert. The studios were moved to Storm Lake and the call letters changed to KKIA. The country format continued, with the slogan "Wild Country--the Moose."

KKIA is now owned by Community First Broadcasting. It is located in Storm Lake with co-owned stations KAYL 990 AM and KAYL-FM 101.7 FM.

KKIA "The Moose" broadcasts country music 24 hours a day, along with local news updates seven times a day, hourly market updates, and local sports play-by-play.

External links

KKIA
Radio stations established in 1987